Sejdini is an Albanian surname. Notable people with the surname include:

Faruk Sejdini (born 1950), Albanian football player and coach
Qazim Sejdini (born 1951), Albanian politician
Trejsi Sejdini (born 2000), Albanian model, Miss Universe Albania 2018

Albanian-language surnames